Edward George Sherrin  (18 February 1931 – 1 October 2007) was an English broadcaster, author and stage director. He qualified as a barrister and then worked in independent television before joining the BBC. He appeared in a variety of radio and television satirical shows and theatre shows, some of which he also directed.

Early life 
Sherrin was born at Gawlers Farm, Low Ham, Somerset, the second son of smallholding farmer Thomas Adam Sherrin (1889–1965) and Dorothy Finch (née Drewett; 1895–1980). He was educated at Sexey's School, in Bruton, Somerset, and rendered his national service in the Royal Signals, being commissioned as an officer in 1950.

Although he read law at Exeter College, Oxford, and subsequently qualified as a barrister (called to the bar by Gray's Inn), he became involved in theatre at Oxford and joined British television in 1956 shortly after the founding of independent television, producing shows for ATV in Birmingham.

Career 
Sherrin joined the BBC in 1957 as a temporary production assistant, then began working for them as a producer in Television Talks in 1963. Specialising in satirical shows, he worked extensively in film production and television.

In 1962, he was responsible for the first satirical television series That Was The Week That Was starring David Frost and Millicent Martin and its successors Not So Much a Programme, More a Way of Life and BBC-3. His other shows and films included Up Pompeii!, Up the Front, The Cobblers of Umbridge, World in Ferment, and The Virgin Soldiers. In 1978, he also hosted We Interrupt This Week, a lively and humorous news events quiz featuring two teams of well-known journalists and columnists sparring against one another. The show was a production of WNET/Channel 13 New York.

Sherrin produced and directed many theatre productions in London's West End, including Jeffrey Bernard is Unwell and the musical revue Side by Side by Sondheim. He received an Olivier Award in 1984 for directing and conceiving The Ratepayers' Iolanthe, an adaptation by Sherrin and Alistair Beaton of the Gilbert and Sullivan opera Iolanthe. Sherrin played the part of Addison in the film Orlando released in 1992.

On BBC Radio 4, from 1986, he presented a light entertainment show on Saturday mornings (latterly evenings) called Loose Ends, and Counterpoint, a quiz show about all types of music, until forced off the air when his voice succumbed to throat cancer.

He also toured the UK with his one-man show  An Evening of Theatrical Anecdotes.

Sherrin wrote two volumes of autobiography, several books of quotations and anecdotes, as well as some fiction; and several works in collaboration with Caryl Brahms.

Personal life 
Openly gay, he was a patron of the London Gay Symphony Orchestra, as well as the Stephen Sondheim Society of Singapore up until 1995. Sherrin was awarded a CBE in the 1997 New Year Honours.

He was diagnosed with unilateral vocal cord paralysis in January 2007; this diagnosis was later changed to one of throat cancer, from which he died on 1 October 2007, aged 76.

Selected works

References 

1931 births
2007 deaths
Alumni of Exeter College, Oxford
BBC people
British radio people
Deaths from cancer in England
Commanders of the Order of the British Empire
Deaths from esophageal cancer
English radio presenters
English television personalities
English theatre directors
English writers
British gay writers
LGBT theatre directors
English LGBT writers
Laurence Olivier Award winners
People educated at Sexey's School
People from Chelsea, London
People from South Somerset (district)
British LGBT broadcasters
Royal Corps of Signals officers
20th-century British Army personnel
British barristers